KORA Organics is a cosmetics company based in the United States and Australia, founded by model Miranda Kerr.

History
KORA Organics was launched in 2009 in Australia by founder, Miranda Kerr, who has a background in nutrition and health psychology. The company started as a bootstrap, having been self-funded by Kerr, who holds a 95% stake. In 2017, KORA Organics began offering its products internationally, first in the U.S., partnering with cosmetics retailer Sephora; it later further expanded to being stocked in 30 countries/regions and shipped to over 120 countries worldwide.

References

External links

Chemical companies established in 2009
Companies based in Melbourne
Pharmaceutical companies of Australia
Pharmaceutical companies established in 2009
2009 establishments in Australia